Sarahana Shrestha is a Nepali-American socialist politician and activist who is a member of the New York State Assembly, representing the 103rd district. She was first elected in November 2022.

Early life and education 
Shrestha was born in Kathmandu, Nepal, and moved to the United States in 2001 to study computer science at the New York Institute of Technology. She became an American citizen in 2019. Shrestha became interested in socialist politics as a college student.

Career 

Shrestha is affiliated with Public Power NY, a coalition of clean energy advocacy organizations. She has also worked as a graphic designer and is the co-chair of the Democratic Socialists of America's Ulster County chapter. Shrestha focused her campaign on climate and renewable energy policy. She was endorsed by the Democratic Socialists of America, Working Families Party, and Congresswoman Alexandria Ocasio-Cortez. Shreshtha was elected in November 2022 and assumed office on January 1, 2023.

References 

Living people
American politicians of Asian descent
People from Kathmandu
People from Esopus, New York
People from Ulster County, New York
New York (state) Democrats
Democratic Party members of the New York State Assembly
Democratic Socialists of America politicians from New York
American climate activists
American people of Nepalese descent
Year of birth missing (living people)